The INSTN (National Institute for Nuclear Science and Technology), in French: L'Institut national des sciences et techniques nucléaires, is a public higher education institution administered by the CEA (French Alternative Energies and Atomic Energy Commission) under the joint authority of the Ministry of National Education, Higher Education and Research, the Ministry of the Economy, Industry and the Digital Sector and the Ministry of the Environment, Energy and Marine Affairs. It is the main center of education for nuclear energy in France.

History
The establishment of INSTN goes back to 1956 with the purpose to train engineers, researchers and technicians who were tasked with implementing the French civil nuclear development programme introduced in the 1950s.

Since its creation, the mission of INSTN has been to support the transfer of knowledge and know-how developed by the CEA and its industrial partners in order to support the growth of the nuclear industry worldwide. One of its main contributions has been to develop human resources required in both research and industry, at various level of qualification from operator to researcher in the nuclear industry.

Structure
It is part of the Saclay Nuclear Research Centre.

See also
 École nationale supérieure d'ingénieurs de Poitiers
 French Alternative Energies and Atomic Energy Commission (CEA)

References

External links
 INSTN (English)
 INSTN (French)

1956 establishments in France
Buildings and structures in Essonne
Educational institutions established in 1956
Engineering universities and colleges in France
Nuclear research institutes in France
Nuclear technology organizations of France
Paris-Saclay
Paris-Saclay University